

Cast
William H. Thompson: Boss Jim McManus
Anna Lehr: Berna
Jack Standing: Nicolay Turgenev
Dorothy Dalton: Ellen McManus
Clyde Benson: Jacob Weil
J.P. Lockney: Peter Saranoff
J. Barney Sherry: Judge Sims

The film
Civilization's Child is a silent film from 1916 directed by Charles Giblyn under the supervision of Thomas H. Ince. Like other films produced by Kay-Bee Pictures the film was praised at the time for its artistic title cards, created by Irvin Willat. A reviewer in Moving Picture World mentioned one title card where "the efforts of a ward politician to get an unprotected girl into his clutches was symbolized by a realistic picture of a spider endeavoring to entice an unsuspecting little fly into the meshes of his web". 
No copies of the film are known to survive.

Plot
After an idyllic childhood in the mountains of Russia, Berna accompanies her uncle to Kiev, to the Jewish part of the city. Many Jewish residents of Kiev are killed by the Cossacks and Berna flees, taking ship for the United States. In New York, she is exploited by a local boss, Jim McManus, who seduces her and puts her out onto the street as a prostitute.

Some time later, Berna marries Nicolai Turgenev, a young musician, and has a baby by him. But Ellen, McManus's daughter, falls in love with Nicolai and succeeds in drawing him away from his family. Meanwhile, McManus has become a judge; he ratifies their separation and grants Nikolai a divorce so that he can marry McManus's daughter and adopt Nikolai's and Berna's child.

Driven mad by desperation, Berna goes to the judge, accuses him of being the cause of her ruin, and kills him.

Production
The film was produced by Kay-Bee Pictures and by the New York Motion Picture Co.

Distribution
The film was distributed by Triangle Distributing, and opened in cinemas on April 23, 1916.

See also
 List of American films of 1916
 List of lost films

References

External links

Film listing on American Silent Feature Film Database  
American Silent Feature Film Database

1916 films
1916 drama films
Silent American drama films
American silent feature films
American black-and-white films
Films directed by Charles Giblyn
Lost American films
1916 lost films
Lost drama films
1910s American films